Nu, ぬ in hiragana, or ヌ in katakana, is one of the Japanese kana each representing one mora.  Both hiragana and katakana are made in two strokes and represent .  They are both derived from the Chinese character 奴.  In the Ainu language, katakana ヌ can be written as small ㇴ to represent a final n, and is interchangeable with the standard katakana ン.

Stroke order

Other communicative representations

 Full Braille representation

 Computer encodings

In popular culture

In the manga "Bobobo-bo Bo-bobo" ぬ is Jelly Jiggler's favorite character.

References

Specific kana